Koz cham Dherai koz cham is a part of Dherai village in Swat, Khyber Pakhtunkhwa province, Pakistan.

The postal code for Dherai is 19130, and 19200 can also be used. Koz cham is a lower part of Dherai village. Basically Dherai village is divided in two parts Bar cham, and Koz cham.

Bar cham is the upper part of Dherai, which is near to the main Airport road which connects Mingora, Kanju, Kabal with Bandai, Matta and other Kalam side regions.

Koz cham is a lower part of Dherai village, which is located almost a half kilometer way from the main Airport road. Koz cham is a square for three villages Damghar, mamdherai and bandai. Koz cham is the main center through which people can easily reach Damghar, mamdherai and bandai.

Geography

East: Kuza bandai and mamdherai

West: Kanju and kabal

North: Damghar, River swat and Mingora City

South: Saidu sharif Airport and kanju township.

Longitude:
Latitude: 34.8
Longitude: 72.3333

The nearest cities are Mingora and Kanju.

There is a police station in Kanju.

Important Personalities of Kuz Cham:
 belongs here.

References

Populated places in Swat District